Töysä is a former municipality in Western Finland. It was consolidated to Alavus on 1 January 2013. It is part of the Southern Ostrobothnia region. Most inhabitants speak Finnish, with hardly any other languages being spoken.

Töysä is known for its shopping village Tuuri and the Veljekset Keskinen department store.

History 
The village of Töysäjärvi was established sometime before 1568. It was larger than the modern Töysä and a part of the Lapua parish. When the Kuortane chapel community was formed in 1645, Töysäjärvi was one of its villages. By the 17th century, the village's name had been shortened to Töysä. Its western part was called Ala-Töysä while the eastern part was called Yli-Töysä. In 1798, Kuortane became a parish while Yli-Töysä became a chapel community within Kuortane named Töysä. At the same time, Ala-Töysä was moved to the Alavus chapel community. The name Ala-Töysä was later supplanted by Ranta-Töysä.

Töysä became a municipality in 1865 and got a parish in 1926. Töysä was consolidated with Alavus in 2013.

Notable people
Jari-Matti Latvala, rally driver
Olli-Pekka Karjalainen, former hammer thrower
Jani Wickholm, pop singer

References

External links

Municipality of Töysä – Official website

 
Populated places established in 1865
Populated places disestablished in 2013
Former municipalities of Finland